1,1'-Thiocarbonyldiimidazole (TCDI) is a thiourea containing two imidazole rings. It is the sulfur analog of the peptide coupling reagent carbonyldiimidazole (CDI).

Synthesis
TCDI is commercially available but can also be prepared via the reaction of thiophosgene with two equivalents of imidazole.

Reactions
The imidazole groups on TCDI can be easily displaced, allowing it to act as a safer alternative to thiophosgene. This behaviour has been used in the Corey–Winter olefin synthesis. It may also replace carbonothioyl species (RC(S)Cl) in the Barton–McCombie deoxygenation. Other uses include the synthesis of thioamides and thiocarbamates. Like the analogous CDI, it may be used for peptide coupling.

References

Thioureas
Imidazoles
Peptide coupling reagents